Nati may refer to:

People 
Nati (surname) (including a list of people with the name)
Nati Seiberg (1956) an Israeli American theoretical physicist who works on string theory

Places
Nati' District a district of the Al Bayda Governorate, Yemen
Punta Nati Lighthouse an active lighthouse on the Spanish island of Menorca
Nati, village in Mongmit Township, Myanmar
Informal name for Natitingou, Benin

Other uses
Nāti language, spoken in Malekula, Vanuatu
Nati (dance), performed in the Indian state of Himachal Pradesh
Nati (film), a 2016 Indian film
Nati, a giant from List of jötnar in Norse mythology
NATI (motorcycle), Russian research institute of car industry
Nati stanchi, a 2002 Italian comedy film
nickname of the Switzerland national football team
nickname of Switzerland's national basketball team